Khezri may refer to:

Khezri Dasht Beyaz, a city in South Khorasan Province, Iran
Hossein Khezri, Iranian activist
Jasmin Khezri (b. 1967), Iranian artist and writer